Lady Natasha Rose Eleanor Finch, known by her maiden name as Lady Natasha Rufus Isaacs (born 24 April 1983 in Swindon, Wiltshire), is an English aristocrat, socialite, and founder of Beulah London.

Early life  
Rufus Isaacs is the second child of Simon Rufus Isaacs, 4th Marquess of Reading, and Melinda Victoria Rufus Isaacs née Dewar. She has an elder sister, Sybilla Alice Hart née Rufus Isaacs (born 1980), and a younger brother, Julian Michael Rufus Isaacs, Viscount Erleigh (born 1986), the heir apparent of the title of Marquess of Reading. She attended Westonbirt School in Gloucestershire in South West England.

Ancestors 

Her great-great grandfather, Rufus Isaacs, was the 1st Marquess of Reading and Viceroy of India in 1921. Her great-great grandparents are Alfred Moritz Mond, 1st Baron Melchett, and Violet Mond, Baroness Melchett.

Her great-great-great grandfather chemist and industrialist Ludwig Mond created the Mond process to extract and purify nickel. Her great-great uncle Sir Robert Mond was a British chemist and archaeologist.

Her great-great grandmother Violet Mond's brother was the painter and sculptor Sigismund Goetze.

Her great-great aunt Lady Joan Rufus Isaacs married Solly Zuckerman, a British public servant, zoologist and operational research pioneer.

Personal life
On 8 June 2013, Rufus Isaacs married lawyer Rupert Finch in Cirencester. They have three children.

Forms of address
Lady Natasha Rufus Isaacs (24 April 1983 – 8 June 2013)
Lady Natasha Finch (8 June 2013–present), known as Lady Natasha Rufus Isaacs

References

1983 births
Living people
People from Swindon
English people of Portuguese-Jewish descent
English people of German-Jewish descent
English humanitarians
People educated at Westonbirt School
Daughters of British marquesses